{{Infobox airport
| name = PAF Base Nur Khan
| nativename = 
| nativename-a = 
| nativename-r = 
| image = File:PAF Base Nur Khan 1.jpg
| image_size = 250
| caption = Logo of PAF Base Nur Khan
| image2 = 
| image2-width = 
| caption2 = 
| IATA = NRK
| ICAO = OPRN
| FAA = 
| TC = 
| LID = 
| GPS = 
| WMO = 
| type = Military
| owner-oper = 
| owner = Government of Pakistan
| operator = Pakistan Air Force
| city-served = Chaklala, Rawalpindi
| location = Rawalpindi, Punjab
| hub = 
| built = 1935
| used = 
| commander =  
Air Commodore
''Itazaz Hussain
| occupants = Pakistan Air Force
 No. 6 Squadron "Antelopes"
 No. 10 Squadron "Bulls"
 No. 12 Squadron "Globe Trotters"
 No. 41 Squadron
 No. 52 Squadron "Markhors"
| metric-elev = 
| elevation-f = 
| elevation-m = 
| coordinates = 
| website = 
| metric-rwy = 
| r1-number = 
| r1-length-f = 
| r1-length-m = 
| r1-surface = 
| h1-number = 
| h1-length-f = 
| h1-length-m = 
| h1-surface = 
| stat-year = 
| stat1-header = 
| stat1-data = 
| footnotes = 
}}Pakistan Air Force Base Nur Khan (founded as RAF Station Chaklala and previously known as PAF Base Chaklala''') is an active Pakistan Air Force airbase located in Chaklala, Rawalpindi, Punjab province, Pakistan. The former Benazir Bhutto International Airport forms part of this airbase. Fazaia Intermediate College, Nur Khan is also located in the base.

History

The base was originally operated by the Royal Air Force as RAF Chaklala and, during the Second World War, parachute training flights were conducted.

Once transferred to the then Royal Pakistan Air Force the base came into use as a transport hub, with the PAF's fleet of various transport aircraft operating from it.

After the Pakistan earthquake of 2005, 300 U.S. troops as well as U.S. aircraft were deployed to Chaklala to aid in relief efforts. According to an anonymous 2013 source, the U.S. had maintained a permanent military presence at Chaklala since late 2001 for handling logistics efforts and other movements in relation to the war in Afghanistan.

In 2009 the PAF's first of four Il-78 aerial refuelling tanker aircraft was delivered to PAF Base Chaklala and the No. 10 MRTT (Multi Role Tanker Transport) squadron was established there.

The name of the base was changed in 2012 from PAF Base Chaklala to PAF Base Nur Khan in remembrance of its first Base Commander in 1947, Air Marshal Nur Khan. Nur Khan was also the second Pakistani chief of the Pakistan Air Force and a veteran of several conflicts fought by Pakistan.

Squadrons
The squadrons at the base are Nos 6, 10, 12, and 41.

No. 6 Squadron was formed without any aircraft or equipment on 14 August 1947 at Maripur, Karachi, under its first commanding officer, Flight Lieutenant M. J. Khan. On 16 August 1947, Air Officer Commanding Air Vice Marshal visited the squadron and commissioned it for heavy airlifting and airborne operations. The PAF acquired a Douglas DC-3 Dakota aircraft on 22 October 1947 and later obtained Bristol Freighter, Tiger Moth, and Auster AOP.9 aircraft. On 29 June 1948, a detachment of the squadron provided a guard of honour at Mauripur for Governor-General Muhammad Ali Jinnah on his arrival from Quetta. On 9 September 1948, three Dakota aircraft performed a flypast at the Quaid-e-Azam's funeral ceremony.

In the 1965 India-Pakistan War the Antelopes dropped parachute commandos into Indian territory in a night-time mission involving three C-130B transports. Just before the 1965 war started, the squadron's commanding officer, Wing Commander Eric Gordan Hall, had the idea of making up for the PAF's deficiency in heavy bombers by modifying the Hercules to carry bombs.[2] It was converted to carry 10,000 kg of bombs, which were rolled out on pallets from the rear ramp, and over 21 night-time bombing raids were flown against Indian forces approaching for the Battles of Chawinda and Pul Kanjari. Support missions for troops in the Northern Areas were continued after the war.

With the unstable political situation at the end of 1970 and the resulting civil unrest, the Antelopes moved a large number of troops to East Pakistan and assisted in flood relief operations there. India stopped the PAF flying over its territory in 1971, and the squadron had to fly to East Pakistan via Sri Lanka. Two of the unit's C-130 transports were deployed to Dhaka from March 71 until the 1971 Indo-Pakistani War began on 3 December 1971. They were used to evacuate soldiers and civilians from hostile areas of East Pakistan – in one sortie a single C-130 evacuated 365 people from Sylhet to Dhaka. During the 1971 war, No. 6 Squadron flew bombing missions from West Pakistan in the same manner as those flown during the 1961 war, and no transport aircraft were lost during these sorties

No. 12 Composite Squadron in September 1953, the Squadron Consists of PAF's Elite Air Crafts amongst which includes Phenom 100 and Gulf Stream IV.

No. 10 Squadron was established as the Tanker Transport (MRTT) Squadron ("Bulls") with delivery of the PAF's first Il-78 in December 2009 and operating from PAF Base Chaklala.

41 Squadron PAF, which consists of Cessna, Beech, and Y-12 amongst other aircraft.

Location
The base has surrounding facilities including the Frontier Works Organization Headquarters, Chaklala Railway Station and the Joint Services Headquarters (JSHQ). Two housing schemes Askaris VIII and IX are also located alongside Nur Khan road that extends to the main entrance of the base from Airport Road. The Centre for Aerospace and Security Studies, a research think tank founded by the Pakistan Air Force, is located next to Nur Khan Base.

See also

 List of Pakistan Air Force Bases

References

External links

Pakistan Air Force bases
Military installations in Punjab, Pakistan
World War II sites in India
Chaklala Cantonment